Syarhey Ivanavich Nikifarenka (born 18 February 1978) is a Belarusian football coach and a former player.

Career
He spent the majority of his career in Shakhtyor Soligorsk. He is Shakhtyor's all-time top scorer and was one of the most prolific scorers of Belarusian League in the late 1990s and 2000s. From 2015 till 2016 he worked as a Shakhtyor Soligorsk head coach.

Honours
Shakhtyor Soligorsk
Belarusian Premier League champion: 2005
Belarusian Cup winner: 2003–04

References

External links

1978 births
Living people
People from Salihorsk
Belarusian footballers
Association football forwards
Belarusian Premier League players
FC Shakhtyor Soligorsk players
FC Dinamo-93 Minsk players
Belarusian football managers
FC Shakhtyor Soligorsk managers
Sportspeople from Minsk Region